Optoacoustics Ltd
Multispectral optoacoustic tomography
Photoacoustic imaging